All Wrestling Organization is an independent wrestling promotion in the Middle East, currently operating out of Netanya, Israel.

History

2012

AWO was founded at early June 2012 by Mahran Abdul Hai. The debut show, "WrestleFest", was held on June 21 in front of a sold out crowd of 600 fans. The show was sponsored and broadcast by Panet. The main event of this show saw The Arabian Horse squaring off against Kronos in a match for the vacant AWO Championship in which The Arabian Horse won and became the first ever AWO Champion.

In July 2012, AWO held an event called "The Ramadan Rumble", its main event saw The Arabian Horse team with The White Leopard against Ken Kerbis & Kronos.

In September 2012, AWO held a show in Kafr Qasim, "Vengeance Day", in front of 400 fans. The main event was a triple threat match for the AWO Championship, between Da Style, Kronos and The Arabian Horse which saw The Arabian Horse emerge victorious and retaining his title.

At November 2012, Kronos defeated The Arabian Horse in a 20 seconds' worth of match at "Face Off". After the former had a successful title defense against Evgeny Lyder, the AWO General Manager, Mr. Saar Etinger, entered the arena and decided to reward Kronos with a title shot.

2013

January 2013 brought "No Man's Land" in front of 100+ fans in Tel Aviv. The event saw the AWO debuts of Iceman & Big Leo as they faced each other, and Kronos retaining the title after defeating The Arabian Horse in a Last Man Standing match.

"WrestleFest II" saw Evgeny Lyder becoming the top contender after winning a triangle TLC match, granting him a title bout VS The Arabian Horse, who in turn regained his title VS Kronos in this very show.

"WrestleChurch" brought upon the eventual title victory for Lyder, as well as his defeat in an impromptu rematch VS The Arabian Horse. He became the top contender once again after scoring the victory in a 12-men battle royal.

"SummerSalam" had Ken Kerbis and Rixon Ruas tearing the house down with Ruas emerging victorious and Da Style beating The Arabian Horse and becoming the champion.

"TLV Clash" was the second show bringing the organization back to Tel Aviv. It featured IWF heavyweight champion Ivan Markov teaming with Idan Boulder VS De Shanell and Kronus, with the latter team scoring the win as Boulder turned against his partner, laying him out with a chairshot. Evgeny Lyder scored the win VS Da Style and became the AWO champion for the second time, only to lose it later on in the evening to Chris Korvinn. In addition, Ataman made his AWO debut in an "open challenge" during which he defeated two wrestlers in a row, never once getting off his feet.

Autumn Fallout brought the AWO once again to Tel Aviv. The commentary was done live for the first time ever in Israel by Moty Aharonovich and Gordon. This time around Udi M & Max Von Punx showed they're here to stay as a tag team, sporting similar outfits and showcased their combined skills in the ring, overcoming White Leopard & Hellboy. Ataman gained another victory-this time over Adi Hurvitz - and increasing his victory streak to 3-0, and interfered for Ken Kerbis in the 6-way Israeli championship match, assisting Ken in becoming the inaugural title holder. Among other results, Chris Korvinn retained his AWO championship after defeating Da Style, and after being distracted by Big Leo, Idan Boulder ended up losing to Joe E. Legend in the final bout which tore the house down.

"Urban Hazzard" took place on December 29 in Tel Aviv. Y & R gained their third victory in a row after defeating Kronos & Da Shannell, who kept on disagreeing up to the point of Shannell costing his team the match. Ken Kerbis retained the AWO Israeli Title as he scored the win over Rixon Ruas. Big Leo was placed in charge of the Sniper/Idan Boulder match as a special guest referee which saw the latter emerging victorious, and Chris Korvinn defeated Da Style to retain the AWO championship in the first ever Lumberjack match in Israel.

2014

"The 11th Plague" took place in Jaffa on March 29, 2014. The card saw the Israeli championship change hands as Rixon Ruas defeated Ken Kerbis to become the new Israeli champion. The main event featured a 9-man battle royal for the AWO championship. Ken Kerbis was the last man standing and was crowned the new AWO champion.

"AWO Revolution" took place in Jaffa of April 26, 2014. The card included: In the opening match, Shay Blanco & Idan Boulder beat Da Style and a returning Da Shannell in a highly exciting match, Mad Zenzero beat Hellboy, Rixon Roas successfully defended his Israeli championship for the first time against Kronos who attacked him after the match ended, Ataman pinned "Blondevil" and AWO champion Ken Kerbis beat Adi Hurvitz and retained his title. After the match, Kronos attacked Kerbis and raised the AWO championship.

On May 29, 2014 the promotion made their debut show in Haifa, the show was taped and was broadcast on the Ego Total channel. "WrestleFest III" took place on June 26, 2014 and saw the debut of former WWE superstars Carlito and Chris Masters (who won the AWO championship), as well as the return of Ivan Markov as he faced the Ataman in a brutal hardcore match. This show was also broadcast on Ego Total as well as the main Ego channel.

The promotion ran a 2-day tour called "International Mayhem" which took place on the 5th and 6 December 2014. The first show took place in Kafr Qara and the second show in Jaffa, both shows featured wrestlers from 7 different countries.

2015

On January 15, 2015 the promotion returned to Jaffa for "In Your Face" which saw Chris Korvinn defends the AWO championship against Mad Zenzero in the main event.

On June 27, 2015 the promotion returned to Tira for 4th edition of "WrestleFest" which saw The Arabian Horse defeats Lev Bar-Tera for the vacant AWO championship. The event took place in the brand new AWO Arena.

"WrestleChurch 2" took place on July 19, 2015 at Kafr Yasif. Eyal Smiley won a battle royal to become the number 1 contender for the AWO championship which he later on won in the main event when he defeated The Arabian Horse in front of a crowd of over 200 fans.

On August 12, 2015 the promotion came back for another show in the AWO Arena at Tira, the show was called "Beatdown!" and it was showcased by the arrival of Chaos who came to defend his UEWA European heavyweight championship against Mad Zenzero and Ray Noceros.

2016

After a long break the AWO return on March 23, 2016 with the "Extreme Rules" show that featured a Number 1 Contender's Match for the vacated AWO Championship to be held on the annual show "WrestleFest v", in that match Blondevil defeated his former tag team partner Goldman in a chairs match in order to face The Arabian Horse for the title.

"The 11th Commandment 2" took place on April 26, 2016 which featured the return of the Israeli Champion Adi Hurvitz and the debut of "The Volk" and Goldman defeats Hellboy in an extreme rules match in the main event.

"The Road To WrestleFest" Was held on May 23, 2016 where "The Arabian Horse" defeated "Rockstar" Adi Hurvitz in a tables match and Blondevil defeated Hellboy.

"Wrestlefest V" has taken place on June 28, 2016 where we saw Goldman win the Number 1 Contenders Match for the AWO Championship, The Volk beat "Rockstar" Adi Hurvitz to win the Israeli Championship & "Blondevil" beat "The Arabian Horse" to become the 3 times AWO Champion, the show had also the debut of A+ (a stable that consist the AWO Academy wrestlers CJ Chaos, Double B, Maor Raizeng, El Mystic, Johnny Light & Dean Arrow).

On July 27, 2016, the "AWO SummeRevolution" show took place where The Volk retained the Israeli Championship against "Rockstar" Adi Hurvitz in a rematch from "Wrestlefest V" and in the main event, the AWO Champion "Blondevil" & the number 1 contender for his title, Goldman has beaten The System (The Arabian Horse & Rockstar Adi Hurvitz), after the match A+ tried to attack The System where they got help from Black Mamba & Johnny Light (who turned against his friends).

On August 24, 2016, "AWO Survival" was and featured a double main event:
The first there was an 8-man elimination tag team match between The System with Jessie Roy & Black Mamba against A+ where A+ won and got a place on the main roster & The Arabian Horse lost his power as the owner of the company to the active General Manager Rom Unger.
The Second main event was the clash of 2 friends for the AWO Championship between "Blondevil" and Goldman, where after a hard fought match, Goldman was able to win and the AWO Championship for his 1st time.

On September 13, 2016, "AWO Reboot" show took place which had the start of a tournament to name the new Number 1 Contender for the AWO Championship where in the 1st round Hellboy, Mr. M., Tyler Dawn & "Rockstar" Adi Hurvitz advanced to the semi final and in the Main Event the newly crowned AWO Champion Goldman defended his title twice in a row against "The Arabian Horse", first in a last man standing match and then in a no disqualification match where he won both of them to retain his title.
the show also featured the first ever Israeli live in-ring segment "The Office" hosted by "The System" ("The Arabian Horse" & "Rockstar" Adi Hurvitz).

On October 25, 2016, "AWO Vengeance Day" show took place which saw first the revealing of the AWO Co-General Manager Zlata Monson as part of "The Office" segment which ended with AWO Champion Goldman turning against all of his friends by attacking the AWO Israeli Champion The Volk.
In the semifinals of the AWO Championship Number 1 Contender tournament Mr. M. beat "Rockstar" Adi Hurvitz and Tyler Dawn beat Hellboy to advance to the final where in the final Dawn tried to hit Mr. M. with a foreign object but got saved by his friend CJ Chaos and in the end Mr. M. won the tournament.
the show also featured a grudge match between Jessie Roy and "The Arabian Horse" (a rivalry that started since AWO Survival) which Jessie Roy got the upper hand and won his match.
In The Main Event for the first time ever there was a Champion Vs. Champion lumberjack match for the AWO Championship between the AWO Israeli Champion The Volk and the AWO Champion Goldman where Goldman used his experience and while the referee didn't noticed he hit The Volk with a low blow to win the match and retain his title with a promise to all the wrestlers that nobody is going to take the title away from him.

On October 26, 2016, the AWO Israeli Champion "The Volk" updated a video post where he told the AWO fans because of what happened in his match against AWO Champion Goldman, he got injuries in his back which make him vacate the AWO Israeli Championship.

2017

On January 24, 2017, AWO Legacy took place where it featured the breakdown of The System (The Arabian Horse & "Rockstar" Adi Hurvitz) after both of them accidentally attack each other in their match they fought backstage where Adi Hurvitz was injured by the Arabian Horse, the show also featured the return of Blondevil to the roster after 5 months of absence, Hellboy won the Israeli Championship & AWO Champion Goldman retained his title by defeating CJ Chaos.

On February 21, 2017, AWO WarZone took place with a double main event, the 1st one was a mask vs. mask match for the AWO Israeli Championship where Hellboy retain his title and made "The Black Mamba" be unmasked only to be revealed as former AWO Israeli Champion & Former AWO Champion Eyal Smiley and in the 2nd main event The Arabian Horse defeated The AWO Champion Goldman in a 20 minutes Iron Man Match with Blondevil as the special enforcer to the match to become the 6th time AWO Champion.

Best of AWO Awards

Best of AWO 2016 Awards

On January 4, 2017, The AWO made a live event for all the fans which held for the 1st time ever in Israeli Wrestling a 2016 end of the year awards hosted by "The Arabian Horse" & "Rockstar" Adi Hurvitz. Afterward the ceremony the AWO owner Mahran Abdul-Hai gave another award to Gery Roif for being the pioneer and cornerstone of the Israeli wrestling. Afterward Abdul-Hai gave a message for all the AWO fans where he spoke about the future of the company and whats to come in 2017.

Best of AWO 2017 Awards
In January 2018, AWO hosted the Best of 2017 Awards

List of AWO special events

2012 events

2013 events

2014 events

2015 events

2016 events

2017 events

2018 events

2019 events

Championships

AWO Heavyweight Championship

Reigns

Combined reigns

AWO Undisputed Championship

Reigns

See also
 Professional wrestling in Israel

References

External links
 Official Youtube page
 Official Facebook page
 Official website

Israeli professional wrestling promotions
2012 establishments in Israel
Organizations established in 2012
Organizations based in Netanya